On 3 August 1979, a Constitutional Convention election was held in Fars Province constituency with plurality-at-large voting format in order to decide four seats for the Assembly for the Final Review of the Constitution.

All seats went to Khomeinist candidates, who were affiliated with the Society of Seminary Teachers of Qom and the Combatant Clergy Association. The clerical candidates supported by the Muslim People's Republic Party and laymen listed by the Quintuple Coalition were all defeated. Lay candidates fielded by the Islamic Republican Party, including a woman, were also defeated.

Results 

 
 
 
 
|-
|colspan="14" style="background:#E9E9E9;"|
|-
 
 
 
 
 
 
 
 
 

|colspan=14|
|-
|colspan=14|Source:

References

1979 elections in Iran
Fars Province